The Point Washington State Forest is in the U.S. state of Florida. The  forest is located in the panhandle, in southern Walton County. It was purchased under Florida's Conservation and Recreation Lands (CARL) program in 1992. The main road through the forest is U.S. Route 98, and it is also near the Topsail Hill Preserve, Grayton Beach and Deer Lake State Parks.

See also
List of Florida state forests
List of Florida state parks

References

External links
 Point Washington State Forest: Florida Division of Forestry- FDACS

Florida state forests
Protected areas of Walton County, Florida